Ravaglia is an Italian surname. Notable people with the surname include:

Luciano Ravaglia (1923–2017), Italian engineer
Nicola Ravaglia (born 1988), Italian footballer
Paolo Ravaglia (born 1959), Italian clarinetist
Roberto Ravaglia (born 1957), Italian racing driver and team owner

Italian-language surnames